The destruction of Mosul Museum artifacts became publicly known on February 26, 2015, when the group known as ISIL released a video showing their destruction.

Mosul Museum
The Mosul Museum, opened in 1952, is the second largest museum in Iraq, with the first being the National Museum of Iraq. The museum is split into four areas of focus: The Assyrian hall, the Hatrene hall, the Islamic hall, and the Prehistoric hall.

Importance of the region
Iraq's present day borders overlap with the historic extent of Mesopotamia. Mesopotamia is considered to be one of the first areas in which urbanization evolved, beginning around the 4th millennia B.C. The "city" became the center of the new social system, resulting in the need of centralized power. Artistically, the land of Iraq holds evidence of the switch from stylized and schematic figures to more realistic representations of the human form. Writing evolved during this time period as well, allowing people to describe divine figures and conceptualize religion. Archaeological efforts uncovered evidence of Mesopotamia as a world contemporary with the Bible, with many stories on cuneiform tablets describing versions of similar biblical texts.

The world's understanding of Iraq and its history comes from the archaeological efforts that have taken place on its land. Because of a lack of visible architectural remains in the area, Mesopotamia, and Iraq in particular, are where the "treasure hunting" of old transformed into the beginnings of  the real archaeological research we know today. Archaeologists have been researching in Iraq for over a century and a half, lending us a great amount of time to truly understand the region's impact on those who live there and ultimately, the rest of the world.

Destruction (2015)

Contents of ISIL video
In a video shared on February 26, 2015, ISIL entered the Mosul Museum with the purpose of destroying artifacts they deemed "idolatrous". Members of the group can be seen pushing over many statues, while using jackhammers and sledgehammers to damage the faces of others. A spokesperson appears in the beginning of the video, explaining the rationale behind the group's actions. The rationale pertains to the assumption that these objects (statues, figurines, etc.) were once worshiped instead of Allah.

A translation from the video is as follows: "These ruins that are behind me, they are idols and statues that people in the past used to worship instead of Allah. The so-called Assyrians and Akkadians and others looked to gods for war, agriculture and rain to whom they offered sacrifices…The Prophet Mohammed took down idols with his bare hands when he went into Mecca. We were ordered by our prophet to take down idols and destroy them, and the companions of the prophet did this after this time, when they conquered countries."

Damage
Not all of the museum's collection was damaged by ISIL. However, the most impacted were the Assyrian and Hatrene areas of the museum. The Islamic hall, which still held many priceless antiquities, was not shown in the video. The Prehistoric hall was also never shown, though most of those artifacts had been removed prior to the destruction.

Assyrian
Nergal Gate: The Nergal Gate is located on the north side of Nineveh, an ancient Mesopotamian city located in present-day Mosul. The gate was built sometime between 704 and 690 BC, which was a time of expansion for Nineveh under the ruler Sennacherib. The gate is related to the ancient Mesopotamian god Nergal, who was associated with the summer solstice, war, destruction, and the netherworld.   
Lamassu: At the Nergal Gate's entrance, and just within the entrance, stand the lamassu. These mythological figures first began appearing in art and architecture during the first half of the second millennium B.C., and are described as large winged human-headed bulls. Aside from being decoration, the lamassu are protective figures, more specifically described as "a benevolent spirit attached to an individual, group, a place or an entrance." The lamassu erected at the entrance of the Nergal Gate at Nineveh are surrounded by relief sculpture that depicts the stages of transport of the human-headed bulls from quarries in Balatai.   

Before the release of the ISIL video on February 26, 2015, the lamassu were in various states of preservation. Of the two figures at the entrance of the gate, one still had its upper portion preserved. The video shows an ISIL member jackhammering face of the lamassu at the right side of the gate. The left one was probably untouched, as it has been missing its upper portion since the late 19th century. The ones located inside the gates were less well-preserved than their counterparts at the entrance. However, both were seen being damaged by jackhammers and sledgehammers. The Assyrian section within the Mosul Museum also holds other lamassu of an earlier style. These may also have become damaged.

Balawat Gates
The Mosul Museum holds in its collection numerous bronze bands of the Balawat Gates, built during the reign of Ashurnasirpal II (883-859 BC). The bands are decorated with scenes of Assyrian war, hunt, and tribute. The Balawat Gates are of archaeological and historical significance because they are considered a "'major' find from a 'minor'" site. Tell-Balawat, the site from which the Balawat Gates originate, was considered a small site in comparison to the neighboring Assyrian sites of Nineveh and Nimrud. Through further research, Tell-Balawat (also known as the city of Igmur-Enlil), was found to be within a "hollow-way" between Nineveh and Nimrud, suggesting that its purpose included defending these two cities.

The displayed bands are shown on ISIL's video, but it is unknown whether they were destroyed at that time. Because the Mosul Museum was previously looted in 2003, some of the bands were already missing. Since the bands are considered portable, it is assumed that some were sold on the black market. The British Museum holds a second pair of the Balawat Gates, built during the reign of Shalmaneser III. These are well documented, and can be used to aid in the identification of the Ashurnasirpal's bands if they arise.

Hatrene statues
Hatra was an ancient city located between the Roman Empire and the Parthian Empire, to the south of present-day Mosul. Its significance is great, as its historical and archaeological record indicate it was a wealthy trading city, influenced heavily by its neighboring peoples and empires. Hatra's artworks are of interest to scholars because they have been analyzed as hybrids of artistic styles from the West and East of the city. For example, a Hatrene statue of a seated goddess is described as having drapery consistent with Buddhist style, while also having the large, protruding eyes typical of Mesopotamian works. 

The Mosul Museum was home to a variety of Hatra's sculptures. Most of the sculptures were images of Hatrene kings or noblemen. The ISIL video shows many of these sculptures being hit with sledgehammers and toppled to the ground. Of the 27 known Hatrene sculptures of kings, 4 were seen damaged in the ISIL video. This represents a 15% loss of these sculptures that are known to be in existence.

Questioned authenticity of damaged artifacts
According to Iraqi archaeologists, some of the collection belonging to the Mosul Museum was moved to the National Museum of Iraq in Baghdad six months prior to the release of the ISIL video. This spared many priceless artifacts from becoming damaged. Additionally, sources have suggested that a portion of the artifacts shown being damaged in the video were in fact reproductions or reconstructions. However, Iraqi archaeologists state this may not be the case entirely. Some artworks known to have been genuine were not shown in the video, leading archaeologists to believe that the portable objects were looted, while larger, non-portable objects were the only ones to be damaged.

Documentation

The 2003 looting of the National Museum of Iraq showed the cultural heritage community the extreme importance of documentation within a museum or archaeological setting. The National Museum of Iraq lacked a complete inventory, which includes photographs of all objects. The problem became exacerbated when salvaged archaeological materials came into the museum in the late 1990s until the 2003 invasion of Iraq. The influx of artifacts made it very difficult for the staff to keep up with its documentation process.

The Mosul Museum may be in this same situation, though information on its documentation processes has not come to light. If photographs of their artifacts are in existence, they will be useful in identifying and recovering the looted artifacts.

Responses

Agencies involved
UNESCO

Cultural Heritage Communities
Artist Uses 3D Tech to Recreate Past Destroyed by ISIS
Museums Responding to Mosul and Nimrud
Iraq's National Museum Reopens Earlier in Response to Outrage over Mosul
Project Mosul: Archaeologists Fight Back ISIS Heritage Destruction with 3D Museum Online

See also
Mosul Museum
Destruction of cultural heritage by ISIL
Mesopotamia
Archaeological looting in Iraq
List of destroyed heritage
UNESCO
Rekrei

References

External links
 Heritage Monitor

Mosul Museum
Collections care
Collections of museums in Iraq
Art history
Museology
Conservation and restoration of cultural heritage